Major General Sir William Bernard Hickie,  (21 May 1865 – 3 November 1950) was an Irish-born senior British Army officer and an Irish nationalist politician.

As a British Army officer Hickie saw active service in the Second Boer War from 1899 to 1902; was Assistant Quartermaster General in the Irish Command from 1912 to 1914, and served in the First World War from 1914 to 1918. He commanded a brigade of the British Expeditionary Force in 1914 and was commander of the 16th (Irish) Division from 1915 on the Western Front.

Family origins
William Hickie was born on 21 May 1865, at Slevoir, Terryglass, near Borrisokane, County Tipperary, the eldest of the eight children of Colonel James Francis Hickie (1833–1913) and his wife Lucila Larios y Tashara (died 1880), originally of Castile. From a long soldierly line and famous Gaelic stock, Hickie's name is best remembered as one of the notable Irishmen who served during the First World War. Two of his four brothers also served, one as a major in the Royal Artillery before becoming a priest. His sister Dolores married Henry Hugh Peter Deasy, founder of the Deasy Motor Car Company. Hickie was educated at St Mary's College, Oscott, Birmingham, a renowned seminary for training youths of prosperous Roman Catholic families.

Military career
Hickie attended the Royal Military College, Sandhurst, from 1882 to 1885. He was commissioned into his father's regiment, the Royal Fusiliers at Gibraltar, in 1885 and served with them for thirteen years in the Mediterranean, in Egypt, and in India, during which time he was promoted to captain on 18 November 1892. In 1899 he graduated as captain at the Staff College, Camberley and was selected when the Second Boer War broke out as a Special Service Officer in which capacity he acted in various positions of authority and command. He left Southampton for South Africa on board the SS Canada in early February 1900, and was promoted from captain of mounted infantry to battalion command as major on 17 March 1900. He was subsequently in command of a corps until eventually at the end of 1900 he was given command of an independent column of all arms. This he held for eighteen months. He served with distinction at the Battle of Bothaville in November 1900, and received the brevet promotion to lieutenant colonel on 29 November 1900. He served in South Africa throughout the war, which ended with the Peace of Vereeniging in June 1902. Four months later he left Cape Town on the SS Salamis with other officers and men of the 2nd battalion Royal Fusiliers, arriving at Southampton in late October, when the battalion was posted to Aldershot.

In December 1902 he was elected a Fellow of the Royal Geographical Society (FRGS).

Irish command
After the end of the war in South Africa there followed various staff appointments, the first from December 1902 as deputy-assistant adjutant-general for district staff in the Cork district. In 1907 he was back in regimental service in Dublin and Mullingar with the 1st Royal Fusiliers, where he was in command of the regiment for the last two years. From 1909 to 1912 was appointed to the Staff of the 8th Infantry Division in Cork where for four years he was well known in the hunting field and on the polo ground. In May 1912, he was promoted to colonel, and became Quartermaster General of the Irish Command at Royal Hospital Kilmainham for which he was appointed a Companion of the Order of the Bath.

First World War

When war was declared the Staff of the Irish Command became automatically the staff of the II Army Corps and accordingly with the outbreak of the First World War in August 1914, he was promoted brigadier general, and as part of the British Expeditionary Force in France took charge of the Adjutant and Quartermaster-General's Department during the retreat of the 2nd Corps after the Battle of Mons, to Paris, and during the Battle of the Marne. In the middle of September 1914, he relieved one of the brigadiers in the fighting line as commander of the 13th Brigade (5th Infantry Division) and then commanded the 53rd Brigade (18th Infantry Division) till December 1915, when he was ordered home to assume command of the 16th (Irish) Division at Blackburn.

Promoted to major-general, Hickie took over from Lieutenant General Sir Lawrence Parsons. Hickie – one of a rare breed, a senior, Irish, Catholic officer – was a popular replacement. It was politically a highly sensitive appointment which required the professionalism and political awareness Hickie, fortunately, possessed as the division was formed around a core of Irish National Volunteers in response to Carson's Ulster Volunteers. He was much more diplomatic and tactful than his predecessors and spoke of the pride which his new command gave him, but did not hesitate to make sweeping changes amongst the senior officers of the Irish Division. After putting the division through intensive training, it left under Irish command of which each man took personal pride. It arrived in December 1915.

Distinguished service

In the next two years and four months during which Hickie commanded the 16th (Irish) Division, it earned a reputation for aggression and élan and won many memorials and mentions for bravery in the engagements during the 1916 Battle of Guillemont and the capture of Ginchy (both of which formed part of the Battle of the Somme), then during the Battle of Messines, in appalling conditions the Third Battle of Ypres and in attacks near Bullecourt in the Battle of Cambrai offensive in November 1917.

During this period the Division made considerable progress in developing its operational techniques but at a price in losses. The growing shortage of Irish replacement recruits (due to nationalist disenchantment with the war and the absence of conscription in Ireland) was successfully met by Hickie by integrating non-Irish soldiers into the division.
 
In February 1918 Hickie was invalided home on temporary sick leave, but when in the hospital the German spring offensive began on 21 March, with the result that after his division moved under the command of General Hubert Gough it was practically wiped out and ceased to exist as a division. Although promised a new command, this did not happen before the Armistice in November. Hickie had typified the army's better divisional commanders, was articulate, intelligent and had been competent and resourceful during the BEF's difficult period 1916–17, laying the foundations for its full tactical success in 1918. He was advanced to Knight Commander of the Order of the Bath in 1918.

Civil engagement

Hickie retired from the army in 1922, when the six Irish line infantry regiments that had their traditional recruiting grounds in the counties of the new Irish Free State were all disbanded. He had identified himself strongly with the Home Rule Act and said that its scrapping was a disaster, and was equally outspoken in condemning the activities of the Black and Tans. In 1925 he was elected as a member of the Irish Senate, the Seanad of the Irish Free State; across Ireland winning the fifth highest number of first-preference votes of the 76 candidates, and due to transfers was the first of the 19 to be elected.

Hickie held his seat until the Seanad was dissolved in 1936, to be replaced by Seanad Éireann in 1937. He was President of the Area Council (Southern Ireland) of the British Legion from 1925 to 1948. Hickie never married. He died on 3 November 1950 in Dublin and was buried in Terryglass, County Tipperary.

References

External links

The British Army in the Great War: The 16th (Irish) Division

1865 births
1950 deaths
Military personnel from County Tipperary
British Army major generals
19th-century Irish people
Irish people of World War I
Irish generals
Irish knights
Knights Commander of the Order of the Bath
Irish officers in the British Army
British Army personnel of the Second Boer War
Royal Fusiliers officers
British Army generals of World War I
Members of the 1925 Seanad
Members of the 1928 Seanad
Members of the 1931 Seanad
Members of the 1934 Seanad
Politicians from County Tipperary
Irish people of Spanish descent
Graduates of the Staff College, Camberley
People from County Tipperary
Graduates of the Royal Military College, Sandhurst
Independent members of Seanad Éireann